James Clair Flood (October 25, 1826 – February 21, 1889) was an American businessman who made a fortune thanks to the Comstock Lode in Nevada. His mining operations are recounted to this day as an outstanding example of what may be done with a rich ore body and a genius for stock manipulation. Flood piled up millions as one of the famed "Bonanza Kings" and is considered to have been one of the 100 wealthiest Americans, leaving an enormous fortune. He is famous for two mansions, the James C. Flood Mansion at 1000 California St. in San Francisco, and Linden Towers located in Menlo Park, torn down in 1936.

Biography 
James Clair Flood was born on October 25, 1826 in Staten Island, New York to Irish immigrant parents. He had an eighth grade education, and was then apprenticed to a New York carriage maker.

In 1849 he sailed for San Francisco and the Gold Rush. After some success in the mines, he returned east to marry Mary Emma Leary of County Wexford, Ireland. They were back in San Francisco by 1854. Flood had two children, Jennie who never married, and James Leary born in 1857. James Leary married Marie Rosina "Rose" Fritz, a burlesque dancer, who died in 1898. James L. had three children from his second marriage, James Flood (b.1900), Mary Emma Flood (Mrs. Theodore) Stebbins (b.1908), and a boy who died at age 5. As a tribute to his father, James L. built the Flood Building on San Francisco's Market Street, which in 2003 was still owned by the Flood family.

Beginning of a fortune 
In 1857 James Flood opened a saloon with partner William S. O'Brien on Washington street in San Francisco. In 1858 they sold the saloon and went into business as stockbrokers. After the discovery of silver in Nevada in 1859, the partners began investing in mining stocks. The following year, Flood and O'Brien formed a partnership with fellow Irishmen James Graham Fair, a mine superintendent, and John William Mackay, a mining engineer. None of the four had impressed themselves on others than their immediate circle of friends and acquaintances until some time in the seventies they joined forces in operating the Consolidated Virginia and the California claims in the Comstock Lode.

Mackay and Fair had the mining knowledge and Flood and O'Brien raised the money. The purchase price of the claims, later to become a fabulous source of wealth, was about $100,000. The original stock issue was 10,700 shares, selling for between $4 and $5 a share.

Stock gambling fever 
The new firm gained control of the 'Consolidated Virginia Mining Company' stock in 1873, and it was in this mine that the greatest silver bonanza in history was discovered in 1873. The ore body was more than 1,200 feet deep, which yielded in March of that year as much as $632 per ton. A little while after uncovering the "big bonanza" the price of the stock went skyward. Flood is traditionally credited with having directed the subsequent proceedings so far as stock market operations were concerned.

San Francisco and the entire mining world were hurtled into a fever of excitement by proof of early reports of richness of the mining claims. The first stock issue was converted into two issues of 108,000 shares each, and by the middle of 1875 the speculative value of the two mines were close to $1,000,000,000. Shares went as high as $710.

It was said that in the first six months of 1875 the output of the mines averaged $1,500,000 monthly.

Seats on the San Francisco Stock and Exchange Board jumped to $25,000 each as a result of the excitement. Varied interests sought to obtain stock control of the rich properties and there came the inevitable crash in which many went to financial doom.

The "Bonanza Kings" profited, however, and late in 1875 Flood and O'Brien sought to become leaders in finance. After producing $133,471,000, the Consolidated Virginia and California mines could not be operated profitably, but in the language of the street, the owners had "caught them coming and going."

Bank of Nevada 
The Bonanza firm was said to be held together by Flood, though he was the most unpopular of the partners with the public, and was regarded by some as a stock manipulator. The advent of Flood and O'Brien, operating independently of Fair and Mackay, into the financial field met fierce resistance from William Sharon and William C. Ralston of the Bank of California. As a result of a battle between the two groups, the Bank of California failed and Flood and O'Brien started the Nevada Bank.

From that time on finance more than mining engaged Flood's time, and much of his wealth went into real estate. Dissension and an ill-fated attempt to corner the world wheat market in 1887 cost the firm millions. William Alvord, President of the Bank of California,  in 1887 warned James C. Flood of signs of irregularities at the Nevada Bank, enabling Flood to avert the collapse of the Nevada Bank following the speculation of its cashier in the wheat market.

References

External links

Photograph of Linden Towers

1826 births
1889 deaths
American investors
American stockbrokers
Burials at Holy Cross Cemetery (Colma, California)
Nob Hill, San Francisco
People from Staten Island
American mining businesspeople
American people of Irish descent
Burials at Cypress Lawn Memorial Park
19th-century American businesspeople